Geoffrey Parsons  may refer to:
 Geoffrey Parsons (lyricist) (1910–1987), British lyricist
 Geoffrey Parsons (pianist) (1929–1995), Australian classical pianist
 Geoff Parsons (athlete) (born 1964), Scottish high jumper
 Geoffrey Parsons (newspaperman), newspaper writer, see Pulitzer Prize for Editorial Writing
 Geoffrey Parsons (poet), see Penguin poetry anthologies